Şamlıq (also, Shamlykh) is a village in the Tovuz Rayon of Azerbaijan.  The village forms part of the municipality of Böyük Qışlaq.

References

See also
Böyük Şamlıq

Populated places in Tovuz District